The Group of the European Right was a far-right political group that operated in the European Parliament between 1984 and 1989.

History
Following the 1984 elections, MEPs from the Italian Social Movement (MSI), Greek National Political Union (EPEN) and French National Front were elected. They formed the first formally far-right Group in the Parliament. They were later joined by John Taylor of the Ulster Unionist Party. In the 1989 elections, the Ulster Unionist retired and his successor sat in a different group whilst the EPEN members lost their seats, and the new MEPs from the German party The Republicans refused to ally themselves with the MSI due to disagreements over the status of South Tyrol. The Group collapsed and was succeeded by the Technical Group of the European Right.

Members

Sources
Department of Economics, University of California, Berkeley
Centre Virtuel de la Connaissance sur l'Europe (CVCE) via European NAvigator
Searchlight
Australian Nationalist Ideological, Historical, and Legal Archive: Theories Of The Right: A Collection Of Articles
BBC News
Europe Politique
European Parliament MEP Archives

References

Former European Parliament party groups
Neo-fascist organizations
Political parties established in 1984
1984 establishments in Europe
Political parties disestablished in 1989
1989 disestablishments in Europe